Upstairs, Downstairs is a British television drama series created by Jean Marsh and Eileen Atkins, and developed by Alfred Shaughnessy for London Weekend Television. The series consists of 68 hour-long episodes that aired in the United Kingdom on ITV from 1971 to 1975, in Ireland on RTÉ from 1972 to 1976 and in the United States as part of Masterpiece Theatre on PBS from 1974 to 1977. It was eventually broadcast in over 70 countries to an audience of over one billion viewers.

The series is set during the period 1903–1930 and takes place largely in the London town house of the Bellamy family.  The "upstairs" and "downstairs" of the title refers to, respectively, the Bellamys and their servants.  The first season introduced David Langton as Richard Bellamy, Rachel Gurney as his wife, Marjorie, Nicola Pagett as their daughter, Elizabeth, and Simon Williams as their son, James.  The household servants were Gordon Jackson as Angus Hudson (the butler), Angela Baddeley as Mrs Bridges (the cook), Jean Marsh as Rose Buck (the head maid), Pauline Collins as Sarah Moffat (maid), Patsy Smart as Maude Roberts (Lady Marjorie Bellamy's personal maid), Christopher Beeny as Edward (first servant), and George Innes as Alfred (the footman). In the second series Jenny Tomasin was introduced as Ruby (a kitchen/scullery maid) and George Innes was replaced by John Alderton as Thomas Watkins. Alderton and Pauline Collins later played their characters in a spin-off series, Thomas and Sarah.

Rachel Gurney and Nicola Pagett both left the show after the second series.  The third series introduced Meg Wynn Owen as Hazel Forrest, Lesley-Anne Down as Georgina Worsley (Richard Bellamy's "niece" – the stepdaughter of Lady Marjorie's late brother Hugo), and Jacqueline Tong as Daisy Peel (another maid). Owen was dropped from the cast after the fourth series and replaced in the fifth by Hannah Gordon as Virginia Hamilton, who becomes Richard Bellamy's second wife. Anthony Andrews also became a regular in the fifth series in the role of Lord Robert Stockbridge, as did Karen Dotrice as Lily Hawkins, another maid in the Bellamy household.

During its run Upstairs, Downstairs won two BAFTA Awards, seven Emmys, and a Peabody and Golden Globe Award. The complete series has been released on DVD in regions one, two, and four.

Series overview

Episodes
A total of 68 hour-long episodes were produced and broadcast during the original run of Upstairs, Downstairs.  They are listed in order of their original airing in the UK.

Series 1 (1971–72)
The first series is set from November 1903 to June 1908 and consists of 13 episodes that aired in two separate sections (October–November 1971 and January–March 1972). For this series the show won the BAFTA for Best Drama.

The first six episodes were made in black and white due to a strike at the ITV companies. When colour facilities became available again midway through production of the series, London Weekend Television remade the first episode in colour at the end of the first series block, thus making the series more marketable for overseas broadcasts. The original black-and-white version was subsequently destroyed. Two colour versions of the episode were edited, with the episode intended for overseas broadcast showing Sarah (Pauline Collins) leaving Eaton Place (as she does in "Board Wages") to maintain the series' continuity with the black-and-white episodes omitted.

For original showings in the United States three episodes from the first British series and ten from the second were merged into a single season of 13 episodes. The unused episodes from these two series were eventually shown in 1989 under the banner "The Missing Episodes".

Series 2 (1972–73)
For its second series Upstairs, Downstairs is set from 1908 to 1910.  As with the first series a total of 13 episodes were produced. This time all were made in colour.  As mentioned above, the first season broadcast in the United States was a conglomeration of three and ten episodes from, respectively, the first and second British series. For its first American season, Upstairs, Downstairs won the 1974 Emmy Award for Outstanding Drama Series while Jean Marsh was nominated for an Emmy as Best Lead Actress in a Drama Series.

Series 3 (1973–74)
The third series is set in the pre-World War I era of 1912–1914 and consists of 13 colour episodes. For this series Upstairs, Downstairs won the BAFTA for Best Drama Series and the Emmy and Golden Globe Awards for Outstanding Drama Series. Jean Marsh won the Emmy for Outstanding Lead Actress in a Drama Series and a Golden Globe nomination for Best Actress in a drama. Angela Baddeley was nominated for Emmy for the Outstanding Continuing Performance by a Supporting Actress.

Series 4 (1974)
Series Four of Upstairs, Downstairs is set during the period of World War I (1914–1918) and consists of 13 colour episodes. This series won an Emmy for Outstanding Limited Series, and Gordon Jackson won the Primetime Emmy Award for Outstanding Guest Actor in a Drama Series.  Jean Marsh, Angela Baddeley and Christopher Hodson received Emmy nominations for, respectively, Outstanding Lead Actress in a Drama Series, Outstanding Continuing Performance by a Supporting Actress, and Outstanding Directing in a Drama Series.

Series 5 (1975)
The final series is set in the post-war period of 1919–1930 and consists of 16 colour episodes. Once again Upstairs, Downstairs won an Emmy for Outstanding Drama Series while Jacqueline Tong received a nomination for Outstanding Continuing Performance by a Supporting Actress in a Drama Series. The series also received a Peabody Award for this season.

References

Bibliography

External links
 
 

Lists of British period drama television series episodes
Episodes